Robert Hutcheson (9 May 1870 – 7 September 1939) was a Canadian sports shooter. He competed in the men's trap event at the 1912 Summer Olympics. He died after being struck by an automobile.

References

1870 births
1939 deaths
Canadian male sport shooters
Olympic shooters of Canada
Shooters at the 1912 Summer Olympics
Sportspeople from Montreal